Gunnar (Gurra) Ljungstedt, (born 1952) was the drummer in the Swedish punk rock band Ebba Grön and later in Imperiet. He was approx. 5 years older than the other members of the band, and a friend of Thåström’s big brother.

References 

Swedish punk rock musicians
1952 births
Living people